Henri Goosen (14 July 1926 – 27 January 2011) was a French diver. He competed in the men's 3 metre springboard event at the 1952 Summer Olympics.

References

External links
 

1926 births
2011 deaths
French male divers
Olympic divers of France
Divers at the 1952 Summer Olympics
Divers from Paris